The Entreprenant was a port tug built in 1965. She is now undergoing restoration as a floating exhibit in Dunkirk Port Museum.

History
Entreprenant and her sister, Audacieux were built in 1965 by Ziegler Frères, Dunkirk.

After more than 40 years service, mainly in Dunkirk, Entreprenant was decommissioned and given to the Port Museum. She will be restored and then opened to visitors as part of the floating museum.

References

Tugboats of France
1965 ships
Museum ships in France